Lieutenant-General Robert Ballard Long (4 April 1771 – 2 March 1825) was an officer of the British and Hanoverian Armies who despite extensive service during the French Revolutionary and Napoleonic Wars never managed to achieve high command due to his abrasive manner with his superiors and his alleged tactical ineptitude. Although he remained a cavalry commander in the Peninsular War between 1811 and 1813, the British commander Wellington became disillusioned with Long's abilities. Wellington's opinion was never expressed directly, though when the Prince Regent manoeuvred his favourite, Colquhoun Grant into replacing Long as a cavalry brigade commander, Wellington conspicuously made no effort to retain Long.  Other senior officers, including Sir William Beresford and the Duke of Cumberland, expressed their dissatisfaction with Long's abilities. The celebrated historian, and Peninsula veteran, Sir William Napier was a severe critic of Beresford's record as army commander during the Albuera Campaign; in criticising Beresford he involved Long's opinions as part of his argument. The publication of Napier's history led to a long running and acrimonious argument in print between Beresford and his partisans on one side, with Napier and Long's nephew Charles Edward Long (Long having died before the controversy reached the public arena) on the other. Recently, Long's performance as a cavalry general has received more favourable comment in Ian Fletcher's revisionist account of the British cavalry in the Napoleonic period.

Background and early military career
Long was born the elder of twin sons to Jamaican planter Edward Long and his wife Mary at Chichester in 1771. Long received a formal education, attending Dr Thomson's School in Kensington until age nine and then being sent to Harrow School until 18 in 1789. After three years at the University of Göttingen studying military theory, Long was commissioned into the 1st King's Dragoon Guards as a cornet in 1791. With the aid of his family's substantial financial resources, Long had been promoted to captain by November 1793 and served with his regiment in Flanders during the Duke of York's unsuccessful campaign there. In the winter of 1794/95, Long had left his regiment and was attached to the staff of General Sir George Don during the retreat into Germany and return to England.

Following his arrival, Long spent time as aide-de-camp to General Sir William Pitt who commanded the defences of Portsmouth and the friendship between the two men served Long well in his future career. By the middle of 1796 Long had again transferred however, joining the Hanoverian Army first as a non-serving officer in the York Rangers and then in command of the Hompesch Mounted Riflemen with a commission he purchased from Baron Hompesch himself for £2,000. This regiment was amongst those dispatched under Sir John Moore in putting down the Irish Rebellion of 1798, Long serving in the town of Wexford.

At the conclusion of the rebellion, Long served with the York Hussars, another Hanoverian cavalry unit at Weymouth until the Peace of Amiens. Long spent the peace studying at the Senior Division of the new Royal Military College at High Wycombe, where he became friends with its lieutenant-governor John Le Marchant, and at the return of war joined the 16th Light Dragoons as a lieutenant colonel, transferring to the 15th Light Dragoons in 1805 under the Duke of Cumberland. It was with this regiment that Long caused the first of his many upsets, almost immediately falling out with his superior officer. The situation deteriorated so much that the two both attempted to command the regiment without consulting each other, resulting in years of arguments and hostility between the two. Part of the friction was due to Long's objection to Cumberland's penchant for excessive corporal punishments, such as 'picketing.' Long was with the regiment for two years during which time it was remodelled as a hussar formation. Eventually the name too changed, becoming the 15th 'King's' Light Dragoons (Hussars).
Long is mentioned frequently in the anonymously authored book "Jottings from my Sabretasch."  The author, a troop sergeant of the 15th Light Dragoons, looked upon Long as a peerless commander. He ascribed virtually all of the superiorities of organisation or training that he claimed for his regiment, over the rest of the British cavalry, to Long's initiatives when in command.

Peninsular War
In 1808 with the dispatch of Sir John Moore's army to Spain, Long again applied for a position and was welcomed by his former commander, who by the time of Long's arrival was preparing to fight the desperate rearguard action of the Battle of Corunna amid the ruins of his campaign. Long did not have a command during the battle but instead served on his commander's staff, presumably being present at Moore's death. Returning to England, Long was soon recruited for Lord Chatham's disastrous Walcheren Expedition as adjutant-general. The campaign was an abject failure due to reconnaissance and supply failures, heavy rain, strong French resistance and a devastating epidemic of what was called at the time "ague," almost certainly malaria, which killed a large proportion of the men garrisoning the town of Flushing (Vlissingen).

In 1810 Long returned to active service joining Wellington's army in the Peninsula. He took command of the cavalry (one British brigade, one Portuguese brigade and an unbrigaded British regiment) of the army of Sir William Beresford during the operations surrounding the first Allied siege of Badajoz. Long took command of the cavalry on 21 March 1811, a mere four days before they were to see action. The cavalry clash at Campo Mayor on 25 March 1811, was to become a very controversial action. Beresford considered that Long had lost control of his light cavalry, which had pursued fleeing French cavalry for up to seven miles until they came within range of the fortress guns of Badajoz. The historian Charles Oman later sided with Beresford in calling the Campo Mayor action reckless, though without naming Long. Beresford also claimed that his taking personal command of the heavy dragoons had prevented Long from ordering them to attempt a suicidal charge against French infantry squares . However, the army as whole felt differently and sided with the 13th Light Dragoons who had pursued the French. The pursuit took place after the 13th had made an epic charge causing no less than six enemy squadrons to rout, having only two and a half squadrons themselves. In contrast to Oman's opinion, the historian Sir John Fortescue wrote, "Of the performance of Thirteenth, who did not exceed two hundred men, in defeating twice or thrice their numbers single-handed, it is difficult to speak too highly." Long was of the opinion, and was subsequently supported in this by the historian Sir William Napier, that if Beresford had released the British brigade of heavy dragoons he would have been able to force the whole French column to surrender. This was the start of the abrasive and acrimonious relationship between Beresford and Long. At the subsequent clash at Los Santos (16 April 1811) Long managed to retain the heavy dragoons under his command and inflicted a reverse on the French cavalry, the French 2nd Hussars suffering considerable losses. On two subsequent occasions, Long was ordered to withdraw from action without engaging whilst still delaying the French through manoeuvre, though Long maintained that he was given orders merely to fall back to a certain position, with no mention being made about delaying the French advance. On each occasion Long withdrew too quickly and gave the French time to respond, apparent failures which frustrated Beresford enough to take advantage of Long's junior rank in relation to allied Spanish cavalry generals to relieve Long of his command, on the day of the Battle of Albuera, and replace him with the more senior general William Lumley. Long subsequently took an honourable part in the battle, though under Lumley's command. Long also served under Lumley at the Battle of Usagre on 25 May 1811, when the British cavalry neatly trapped two regiments of French dragoons at a bridge, inflicting severe casualties.

Long was given command of a light cavalry brigade in June 1811, following his promotion to major general, these troops were involved in a skirmish near Elvas, where a picket of around fifty men of the 11th Light Dragoons was captured (only one man escaped). Wellington was present on this occasion and gave Long a strongly worded reprimand which effectively stalemated his career. Long's political friends were, however, too strong at this stage to allow his recall from active service and therefore Long maintained his brigade command. He commanded the cavalry under Sir Rowland Hill at Arroyo dos Molinos, where a whole French infantry division and several regiments of cavalry were trapped and destroyed as fighting units.  Long's cavalry charged and broke the French cavalry and captured over 200 of them plus three pieces of artillery (General Bron, commanding the French cavalry, and the Prince of Aremberg, commander of the 27th Chasseurs, were also captured).

Long commanded a brigade (consisting of a single regiment - the 13th Light Dragoons) at the Battle of Vitoria in 1813. He fought at the Battle of the Pyrenees later in the same year. When Marshal Soult's large-scale attack across the Pyrenees was launched, on 25 July 1813, it caught Wellington's forces off guard and in an extended state. Long's brigade was acting as the vital link between the two main bodies of Anglo-allied troops. It was in this situation that Long performed the most important service in his active military career. General Lowry Cole sent a dispatch to Wellington to say that a French army of about 35,000 men had forced him from his defensive position and that he was falling back. The dispatch came into Long's hands and he, upon his own initiative, opened it and made a copy to be sent to his immediate superior Sir Rowland Hill. Hill then forwarded the dispatch to Wellington who had recently moved his headquarters.  The original copy of the dispatch went to the location Wellington's previous headquarters and did not reach him that evening.  Long's intelligent actions allowed Wellington time to react to Soult's movements; had any appreciable delay occurred before Wellington became apprised of the situation the results could have been disastrous for the allied army.

The end of active service

Long's final action was in the Siege of Pamplona, after which he was recalled by the Duke of York to England with Wellington's agreement. Long corresponded with Wellington, who assured him that Long's recall was not at his request.  Long strongly suspected that the Prince Regent had engineered his recall to vacate the command of his brigade so that Colquhoun Grant (commonly known as "The Black Giant"), the Prince's favourite, could be made its commander. Grant was also an intimate of the Duke of Cumberland which must have caused Long further displeasure. Long refused the proffered posting as a divisional commander in Scotland and scornfully retired to his estate at Barnes Terrace, Surrey.

As an officer on the general list, Long was promoted in retirement; he was promoted to lieutenant general in 1821. Royal recognition was not forthcoming however after his public feuds with two royal princes, and Long was not knighted or offered a title, unlike many of his contemporaries. He died childless in 1825 at his London house in Berkeley Square and was buried in the family crypt at Seale, Surrey.

Legacy

After his death, his nephew Charles Long, a notable scholar and historian, wrote several pamphlets defending his uncle's reputation and attacking his enemies, especially Beresford; exchanges of pamphlets and letters between Charles Long and his uncle's opponents continued through the 1830s.

Robert Long was a conscientious and brave officer, whose reputation suffered as a result of certain character flaws.  If his record as a cavalry general was chequered he, nevertheless, contributed substantially to a number of victories, including Los Santos, Usagre and Arroyo dos Molinos. It is to be regretted that he is chiefly remembered for the long-running acrimony generated by the action at Campo Mayor.

To his subordinates he appears to have been a popular and respected figure; characteristically he refused to allow Wellington's censure of the 13th Light Dragoons, following Campo Mayor, to be entered in the regiment's official record.  From the rank-and-file he gained the affectionate appellation "Bobby Long." The officers and men of the 13th Light Dragoons repaid his regard for them when they voluntarily subscribed to the purchase of a set of silver plate for Long when he was replaced in command of his brigade.

Unfortunately, Long could not, it seems, avoid entering into vituperative conflicts with his superiors. When the men he made personal enemies of included royal princes (both later to become kings) and a field marshal (albeit in the Portuguese service) Long's career and reputation were bound to be adversely affected.  An example of the less attractive side of Long's character is the manner in which he operated a campaign of irritation against Beresford after Campo Mayor. Long harassed Beresford by requesting clarification, to the minutest degree, of virtually every order he was given.  Long did not seem to recognise that there were conflicts he had no hope of winning. Beresford was the superior officer with all the advantage of power within the relationship. Long's campaign backfired badly when Beresford, as soon as opportunity allowed, replaced him as the commander of the cavalry.

Long was a regular letter writer, particularly to his twin brother Charles. The lively letters he wrote whilst on campaign in the Peninsular War were collected, edited and published in 1951.  They provide a valuable insight into the workings of Wellington's army, particularly the cavalry.

Further reading 
Inheriting the Earth: The Long Family's 500 Year Reign in Wiltshire; Cheryl Nicol

Notes

References 
 Beamish, N.L. History of the King's German Legion, Vol. II, London (1837).
  This contains a number of inaccuracies of fact: Long commanded all of Beresford's cavalry: one brigade of British heavy cavalry, a brigade of Portuguese cavalry and an unbrigaded regiment of British light cavalry, not merely a single brigade; the head-dress of the York Hussars was a mirleton (a peakless, truncated conical hat), the newly converted British hussars wore fur kolpaks.
 Fletcher, I. Galloping at Everything: The British Cavalry in the Peninsula and at Waterloo 1808-15, Spellmount, Staplehurst (1999) .
 McGuffie, T.H. (ed).  Peninsular Cavalry General (1811-1813): The Correspondence of Lieutenant-General Robert Ballard Long, London (1951).
 Napier, W.F.P. History of the War in the Peninsula and the South of France 1807-1814, London, 2nd ed. (1828–1840).
 Oman, C. (Sir Charles) History of the Peninsular War, Vol. VI: Sep. 1812-Aug. 1813, Oxford (1922)

1771 births
1825 deaths
Burials in Surrey
Military personnel from Sussex
People educated at Harrow School
University of Göttingen alumni
1st King's Dragoon Guards officers
16th The Queen's Lancers officers
15th The King's Hussars officers
British Army personnel of the French Revolutionary Wars
People of the Irish Rebellion of 1798
British Army lieutenant generals
British Army personnel of the Napoleonic Wars
Robert Ballard